In some versions of Arthurian legend, Lynette (alternatively known as Linnet, Linette, Lynet, Lynette, Lyonet) is a haughty noble lady who travels to King Arthur's court seeking help for her beautiful sister Lyonesse (also Linesse, Lioness, Lionesse, Lyones, Lyonorr, Lyonors), whose lands are besieged by the Red Knight. The young Gareth picks up the quest, eventually marrying Lyonesse, while Lynette becomes the lady of his brother Gaheris.

In Le Morte d'Arthur

They are most famously depicted by Thomas Malory in Le Morte d'Arthur, where they are sisters of Gringamore (Guinguemar) from Avalon. In Book IV: The Tale of Sir Gareth of Orkney, Dame Lynette comes to court asking for assistance against the Red Knight of the Red Lands. Since Lynette refuses to reveal her name for reasons which are not explained, she is presented with a kitchen servant instead of a champion. He says his name is Beaumains, but he is really King Arthur's nephew Gareth of Orkney in disguise. On their journey, the pair encounters the Black, Green, Red, and Blue Knights, and finally the Red Knight of the Red Lands (Sir Ironside). Gareth slays the Black Knight, incorporates the others into Arthur's court, and rescues Lynette's sister Lyonesse. Lustily in love with Lyonesse, Gareth conspires to consummate their relationship before marrying. Only by the magical intervention of Lynette is their tryst unsuccessful, thus preserving Gareth's virginity and, presumably, his standing with God.

Gareth later counsels Lyonesse to report to King Arthur and pretend she does not know where he is; instead, he tells her to announce a tournament of his knights against the Round Table. This allows Gareth to disguise himself and win honor by defeating his brother knights. The heralds eventually acknowledge that he is Sir Gareth right as he strikes down Sir Gawain, his brother, in a joust. The book ends with Gareth rejoining his fellow knights and marrying Lyonesse. At court, Lynette falls in love with another of Gareth's brothers, Gaheris. Their niece, Laurel, also marries the third brother, Agravain.

In modern adaptations
 In Alfred Tennyson's poem Gareth and Lynette, the poet implies that it is Lynette whom Gareth marries.
 Lynette is the main character of Vera Chapman's 1976 novel The King's Damosel.
 In Gerald Morris' 2000 novel The Savage Damsel and the Dwarf, Lynet is the feisty main character, but Lyonesse is cruel and stupid. In this adaptation, the reason Lynet does not reveal her name to King Arthur is that her father fought in a battle against him; she fears the King would therefore turn her away if he knew her identity. Lynet is a recurring character throughout The Squire's Tales series.
 In 1998, Warner Bros. released an animated film titled Quest for Camelot, which is loosely based upon Chapman's novel. Significant changes were made to the plot and themes of the story, including the following:
 Lynette is renamed Kayley; she has no older sister, and is trying to save her mother from Ruber by retrieving Excalibur and warning Arthur of the impending attack on Camelot.
 The darker elements of Lynette/Kayley's childhood, including her rape, are absent. Instead, she has a seemingly perfect childhood up until her father is killed by Ruber. In both versions, she is portrayed as a tomboy who has more interest in horseback riding and combat than more "ladylike" pursuits.

References

External  links

Gareth and Lynette at the Camelot Project

Arthurian characters
Fictional lords and ladies
Literary duos
Sibling duos